"Que Sera Mi Vida (If You Should Go)" is a 1979 song by French musical group Gibson Brothers, released as the third single from their fourth album, Cuba (1979). It is their highest charting single in the UK, reaching number five on the UK Singles Chart. It did not chart in the US pop charts, but made it to number eight on the Billboard Hot Dance Club Play chart.

Track listing
 7" single
A. "Que Sera Mi Vida (If You Should Go)" – 3:57
B. "Heaven" – 3:56

 12" single
A. "Que Sera Mi Vida (If You Should Go)" – 6:51
B. "You" – 4:23

Critical reception
David Hepworth from Smash Hits said, "Their usual exuberant sound, but the bassline that made "Cuba" such a classic is getting a little exhausted."

Charts

Weekly charts

Year-end charts

Sales and certifications

References

External links
 Gibson Brothers - Que Sera Mi Vida on Discogs
 Music Video on YouTube

1979 songs
1979 singles
Gibson Brothers songs
Island Records singles
Songs written by Nelly Byl
Songs written by Jean Kluger